Lockland High School is a public high school in Lockland, Ohio, USA. It is the only High School in the Lockland Local School District. The school has open enrollment, meaning students are not required to live inside the Lockland Local School District.

Athletics
Lockland's sports teams are known as the Panthers. The Panthers are a member of the Miami Valley Conference's Scarlet Division. Prior to joining the MVL, Lockland was a member of the Fort Ancient Valley Conference.

Ohio High School Athletic Association State Championships

 Boys' baseball – 1955
 Boys' track and field – 1945
 Boys' basketball - 1952, 1955

Notes and references

External links
 
 District website
 Lockland Wrestling

High schools in Hamilton County, Ohio
Public high schools in Ohio